Frank Owen may refer to:

Frank Owen (baseball) (1879–1942), American baseball player
Frank Owen (politician) (1905–1979), British journalist, author and MP
Frank Owen III (1926–1999), American politician from Texas
Frank Owen (author) (1893–1968), American author, novelist and anthologist
Frank Owen (artist) (born 1939), American abstract painter

See also

Frank Owens